Michael of Alexandria may refer to:

 Pope Michael I of Alexandria, ruled in 743–767
 Patriarch Michael I of Alexandria, Greek Patriarch of Alexandria in 860–870
 Patriarch Michael II of Alexandria, Greek Patriarch of Alexandria in 870–903